James Sutton may refer to:

James Sutton (MP) (c. 1733–1801), Member of Parliament for Devizes, 1765–1780
James Sutton (Shardlow) (1799–1868), canal carrier and High Sheriff
James Patrick Sutton (1915–2005), United States Congressman from Tennessee
James Sutton (actor) (born 1983), English television actor
James Sutton (racing driver) (born 1985), English racing car driver
Jam Sutton (born 1986), photographer and director
Jim Sutton (born 1941), New Zealand politician
James Sutton a.k.a. James Files (born 1942), alleged participant in the assassination of John F. Kennedy